Davon Coleman (born January 11, 1991) is an American gridiron football defensive tackle who is a free agent. He most recently played for the Ottawa Redblacks of the Canadian Football League (CFL). In college, he first enrolled at Fort Scott Community College before transferring to Arizona State University. He has also been a member of four National Football League (NFL) teams (Dallas Cowboys, Chicago Bears, Tampa Bay Buccaneers) and three other CFL teams (Hamilton Tiger-Cats, BC Lions, Toronto Argonauts).

Early years
Coleman attended Glenville High School. As a senior, he received honorable-mention All-Ohio honors. He also practiced wrestling.

College career
Coleman enrolled a Fort Scott Community College. As a redshirt freshman, he tallied 65 tackles, 8.5 tackles-for-loss, 2.5 sacks, two forced fumbles, two passes defensed and one interception. He transferred to Arizona State University after the season.

As a sophomore, he appeared in 13 games with 3 starts. He collected 42 tackles (5 for loss), 2.5 sacks, one pass defensed and one forced fumble. He had 5 tackles against the University of Southern California.

As a junior, he played mostly at defensive end (9 starts). He posted 66 tackles, 11 tackles for loss (fifth on the team), 5 sacks, one fumble recovery and one blocked extra point. He had 9 tackles (2 for loss) and one sack filling in for an injured Will Sutton against the University of Oregon. He made 10 tackles against the University of Southern California. He had 2 sacks and 3 tackles for loss against Washington State University.

As a senior, he moved to defensive tackle and started all 13 games. He recorded 58 tackles, 8.5 sacks (tied for the team lead) and 15 tackles for loss (third on the team). Against the University of Colorado, he had  four tackles (2.5 for loss), .5 sacks, forced an intentional grounding in the end zone for a safety and caught a short reception on the goal line from the fullback position for his first career touchdown. He made 1.5 sacks and 2.5 tackles for loss against the University of Utah. He had 2.5 sacks and 3.5 tackles for loss against UCLA.

He finished his college career with 166 tackles (31 for loss) and 16 sacks in 39 games (22 starts).

Professional career

Dallas Cowboys
Coleman was signed as an undrafted free agent by the Dallas Cowboys after the 2014 NFL Draft, on May 13. Because of injuries on the defensive line, he made his NFL debut and first career start in the season opener against the San Francisco 49ers, recording two tackles. He was active for the first 2 contests, before his progress was slowed after suffering a knee injury in a weight room accident. He was declared inactive for the next 8 games and was eventually waived on November 22. He was signed to the practice squad on November 24.

Chicago Bears 
On December 22, 2015, the Chicago Bears signed Coleman to the practice squad.

Tampa Bay Buccaneers 
On February 5, 2016, he was signed to a futures contract by the Tampa Bay Buccaneers. On May 17, he was released to make room for defensive tackle A. J. Francis.

New York Giants 
On July 29, 2016, Coleman signed as a free agent with the New York Giants. On August 30, 2016, he was waived by the Giants.

Hamilton Tiger-Cats 
On April 19, 2017, Coleman signed with the Hamilton Tiger-Cats of the Canadian Football League. He appeared in 17 games with 16 starts at defensive tackle, while making 41 tackles and 5 sacks.

BC Lions 
On May 25, 2018, Coleman was traded along with a 2019 sixth-round pick to the BC Lions in exchange for a 2019 fourth-round pick. On November 7, 2018, his contract was extended through the 2019 season. He played in all 18 regular season games, recording 57 defensive tackles, eight sacks, and two interceptions. He was named a CFL All-Star at the end of the season. In 2019, Coleman played in eight games for the Lions, contributing with 13 defensive tackles, two sacks and one interception.

Toronto Argonauts 
On August 12, 2019, Coleman was traded to the Toronto Argonauts along with a conditional 2020 eighth-round draft pick in exchange for defensive end Shawn Lemon. He appeared in six games, collecting 16 tackles and two sacks.

Ottawa Redblacks 
On February 5, 2021, Coleman signed with the Ottawa Redblacks. He played in all 14 regular season games in 2021 where he had 32 defensive tackles and four sacks. In 2022, he recorded 16 defensive tackles, four sacks, and two forced fumbles. He scored his first career touchdown on September 2, 2022, in the Labour Day Classic where he returned a fumble seven yards for the major. He was released on February 24, 2023.

References

External links

Arizona State Sun Devils bio

Living people
1991 births
Sportspeople from Fayetteville, North Carolina
Glenville High School alumni
African-American players of American football
African-American players of Canadian football
Players of American football from Louisiana
American football defensive tackles
Canadian football defensive linemen
Fort Scott Greyhounds football players
Arizona State Sun Devils football players
Dallas Cowboys players
Chicago Bears players
Tampa Bay Buccaneers players
New York Giants players
Hamilton Tiger-Cats players
BC Lions players
Toronto Argonauts players
Ottawa Redblacks players
21st-century African-American sportspeople